Thurrock is a constituency represented in the House of Commons of the UK Parliament since 2010 by Jackie Doyle-Price, a Conservative.

History 
History of boundaries

The seat was created from South East Essex as a result of the interim redistribution carried out for the 1945 general election. It remained unchanged until the redistribution following the reorganisation of local authorities under the Local Government Act 1972 (not coming into force until the 1983 general election), when it lost northern parts to the new constituency of Billericay. There was a small change for the 2010 general election, when East Tilbury was included in the new constituency of South Basildon and East Thurrock.

History of results

All campaigns since the seat's 1945 inception have resulted in a minimum of 26.8% of votes at each election for the main two parties, with Labour or the Conservatives alternating between first and second place. The third-placed party's share of the vote has fluctuated between 31.7% and 20.1% of the vote for UKIP and between 8.1% and 21.7% in the case of the Liberal Democrats and that party's predecessors. The seat attracted two candidates in 1959 and seven in 2015.

Thurrock was for 38 years from and including 1945 a large-majority Labour seat in parliamentary elections. The post-Falklands War election in 1983 gave a majority of less than 4% of the vote to a recently-split Labour Party (the breakaway faction, the SDP, came third). A Conservative gained Thurrock in 1987 with a small majority. In 1992, it was regained by a Labour candidate, Andrew MacKinlay. During his tenure as MP, MacKinlay was criticised for his questioning technique used on weapons expert Dr. David Kelly.

In the 2010 general election, a Conservative gained the seat, with Jackie Doyle-Price being elected as the MP on a majority of 92 votes, the third most marginal in that election. The 2015 result gave the seat the 8th most marginal majority of the Conservative Party's 331 seats by percentage of majority. In that 2015 election fewer than 1,000 votes separated the top three parties: Conservative, Labour and UKIP. The seat has had bellwether outcome status since 1997.

In 2017, the seat was number 1 on UKIP's 2017 target list, the party only needing a 0.98% swing to win the seat from third place if the previous result were repeated. The constituency was also at number 7 on Labour's target list, with a 0.54% swing needed for their candidate to win the seat. In the event, the swing to Labour was around 0.2% and Doyle-Price held the seat by a mere 345 votes, making it the 26th-closest nationally (of 650 seats). This was also the third consecutive occasion that Thurrock had been held or won very narrowly. At the 2019 general election, Doyle-Price's vote share increased by 19.1%, the largest increase in vote share achieved by any Conservative candidate in the United Kingdom at that election, and her majority rose to 11,482 votes.

Prominent frontbenchers
Dr Oonagh McDonald was Opposition Spokesman on Defence from 1981 to 1983, and then Opposition Spokesman on Treasury and Economic Affairs from 1983 to 1987.

Boundaries and boundary changes 

1945–1983: The Urban District of Thurrock.

The House of Commons (Redistribution of Seats) Act 1944 set up Boundaries Commissions to carry out periodic reviews of the distribution of parliamentary constituencies. It also authorised an initial review to subdivide abnormally large constituencies in time for the 1945 election. This was implemented by the Redistribution of Seats Order 1945 under which South East Essex was divided into two constituencies.  As a consequence, the new Thurrock Division of Essex was formed, comprising the Urban District of Thurrock (created largely from amalgamating the Urban Districts of Grays Thurrock and Tilbury and the Rural District of Orsett).

1983–2010: The Borough of Thurrock wards of Aveley, Belhus, Chadwell St Mary, East Tilbury, Grays Thurrock North, Grays Thurrock Town, Little Thurrock, Ockendon, Stifford, Tilbury, and West Thurrock.

Northern areas transferred to the new County Constituency of Billericay.

2010–present: The Borough of Thurrock wards of Aveley and Uplands, Belhus, Chadwell St Mary, Chafford and North Stifford, Grays Riverside, Grays Thurrock, Little Thurrock Blackshots, Little Thurrock Rectory, Ockendon, South Chafford, Stifford Clays, Tilbury Riverside and Thurrock Park, Tilbury St Chads, West Thurrock, and South Stifford.

Following a redistribution of local authority wards, East Tilbury was transferred to the new County Constituency of South Basildon and East Thurrock.

Constituency profile

Following the 2019 UK general election, Thurrock was retained by the Conservatives with a majority of nearly 11,500 votes, making it a safe Conservative seat. This was a significant increase over the 2017 general election when the Conservatives held the seat by just over 300 votes, when it was a marginal seat between the Conservatives and Labour. This industrial Essex seat, east of London, includes the towns of Grays, Tilbury and Purfleet and 18 miles of the north bank of the Thames.

Historically known for quarrying and heavy industry, it is now a retail destination thanks to the Lakeside Shopping Centre. Retail and distribution are big employers, while Tilbury Power Station has closed and Coryton oil refinery is being redeveloped as a business park. Tilbury is also London's major port, handling millions of tonnes of cargo a year and is a major cruise ship terminal.

Workless claimants, registered jobseekers, were in November 2012 higher than the national average of 3.8%, at 4.8% of the population based on a statistical compilation by The Guardian.  The regional average for the Eastern England region was considerably lower, at 3.2% of the population.

Members of Parliament

Elections

Elections in the 2010s

Elections in the 2000s

Elections in the 1990s

Elections in the 1980s

Elections in the 1970s

Elections in the 1960s

Elections in the 1950s

Election in the 1940s

See also
 List of parliamentary constituencies in Essex

Notes

References

Parliamentary constituencies in Essex
Politics of Thurrock
Constituencies of the Parliament of the United Kingdom established in 1945